Partamona peckolti is a species of stingless bee from South America.

References

Meliponini
Insects described in 1901